The Alpine Cowboys are a professional baseball team based in Alpine, Texas, in the Big Bend region of West Texas. The Cowboys are a franchise of the Pecos League, which is not affiliated with a Major League Baseball organization.  They play their home games at Kokernot Field, a 1,200 seat stone and wrought-iron replica of Chicago's Wrigley Field that dates from 1948.

History
Alpine and the Big Bend region have a long baseball history.  From 1947 to 1958, the Alpine Cowboys, owned by West Texas rancher and philanthropist Herbert L. Kokernot, Jr., won a dozen regional semi-pro championships and were national runners-up.  The team featured future major league stars, including Norm Cash, Gaylord Perry, and Joe Horlen.  At the end of championship seasons, Kokernot presented each team member with a pair of handmade red cowboy boots emblazoned with the brand of his "o6" Ranch—a tradition that continues with the current Cowboys' cap insignia.

In 1959, the Boston Red Sox moved their minor league affiliate, the Lexington Red Sox of the Nebraska State League, to Alpine, and took the traditional name "Cowboys" for the team.  The new Cowboys immediately won the Class D Sophomore League title and set the record for the highest winning percentage (88–35, .715) of any Red Sox minor league team.  The 1959 champion team was managed by future Red Sox manager Eddie Popowski and featured three future major leaguers, pitcher Don Schwall, who two years later won the American League Rookie of the Year Awards; second baseman Chuck Schilling, who finished fourth behind Schwall in the same balloting; and pitcher Guido Grilli.  The 1960 team featured future California Angels all-star Jim Fregosi.  In 1962, the Sophomore League folded and the team moved to Idaho, becoming the Pocatello Chiefs of the Class C Pioneer League.

Professional baseball returned to Alpine in 2009 with the Big Bend Cowboys of the Continental Baseball League.  The team was founded by Frank Snyder, a Fort Worth law professor, who had previously founded the CBL's Texarkana Gunslingers and who brought several local investors from the Alpine area into the new team.  It was successful on the field, losing in the league finals in 2009 to the Alexandria Aces, and winning the Ferguson Jenkins Trophy in 2010 as CBL champions.  The CBL folded at the end of the 2010 season.  The Cowboys were reorganized as a nonprofit corporation and along with another CBL team, the Las Cruces Vaqueros, became part of the new Pecos League for the 2011 season.

In 1946, Herbert L. Kokernot, Jr., son of Texas cattle rancher and entrepreneur Herbert L. Kokernot, retooled the semi-professional baseball team the Alpine Cats into the Alpine Cowboys. While semi-professional teams were not uncommon in Texas at the time, the Alpine Cowboys had the unusual benefit of a brand new stadium, Kokernot Field, opened for them in 1947. Constructed at a cost of $1.5 million, the elaborately decorated stadium included imported infield clay shipped by train from Georgia. The Alpine Cowboys used the stadium as home base from 1947 through 1958, during which time they took a dozen titles in the regional and were runners up for a national championship. In addition to supporting the team and the region with a state of the art stadium, Kokernot also actively supported athletes in Alpine and elsewhere, bringing promising high school graduates onto the roster of the team and offering college scholarships to players throughout the southwest.

In a 2007 article, The Fort Worth Star-Telegram described the team as "one of the state's finest semiprofessional teams". The team launched a number of baseball professionals, including two Hall of Fame inductees. Among them was coach Tom Chandler. Team members included Gaylord Perry and Norm Cash.

In the days of segregation in Texas, Kokernot arranged for many exhibition games between traveling Negro league teams—led by such stars as Satchel Paige—and visiting Mexican League teams.  Those exhibitions drew fans from hundreds of miles away.

Roster

Notable alumni

 Jon Edwards (2011)

References

External links
 
 Video footage of Big Bend Cowboys

Continental Baseball League teams
Pecos League teams
Professional baseball teams in Texas
Brewster County, Texas
1946 establishments in Texas
Baseball teams established in 1946